The Chișinău Central Cemetery is a cemetery located in the Sectorul Centru of Chișinău, Moldova, in the "triangle" of Alexei Mateevici, Vasile Alecsandri and Pantelimon Halippa. Founded in 1811, it is the resting place of many prominent personalities in the history and culture of Moldova.

Notable interments
 Doina and Ion Aldea Teodorovici (d. 1992), musical duo
 Maria Biesu (1935–2012), opera singer
 Ion Ciubuc (1943–2018), statesman
 Vladimir Curbet (1930–2017), choreographer
 Nicolae Dabija (1948–2021), writer, literary historian, and politician
 Kirill Ilyashenko (1915–1980), politician, Chairman of the Presidium of the Supreme Soviet of the Moldavian SSR (1963–1980)
 Alexei Mateevici (1888–1917), poet
 Sergiu Niță (1893–1940), politician, Minister for Bessarabia (1920–1921, 1926–1927)
 Alexandru Plămădeală (1888–1940), sculptor
 Georgeta Snegur (1937–2019), First Lady of Moldova (1990–1997)
 Leonida Lari (1949-2011),poetă, publicistă, scriitoare, activistă, om politic

References

External links
 

Cemeteries in Moldova
Buildings and structures in Chișinău